Boyz N the Hood (Music From the Columbia Motion Picture) is the soundtrack to John Singleton's 1991 film Boyz n the Hood. It was released on July 9, 1991 through Qwest Records with distribution via Warner Bros. Records, and contains mostly hip hop music. The album consists of fourteen songs performed by the likes of 2 Live Crew, Compton's Most Wanted, Hi-Five, Ice Cube, Kam, Main Source, Monie Love, Too $hort, Yo-Yo and more. Audio production was handled by several record producers, including DJ Pooh, Al B. Sure!, DJ Jazzy Jeff, DJ Slip, Raphael Saadiq, Sir Jinx and The Unknown DJ. The soundtrack made it to number 12 on the Billboard 200 albums chart in the United States.

The album also spawned two singles: Tevin Campbell's "Just Ask Me To", which peaked at number 88 on the Billboard Hot 100 and at number nine on the Hot R&B/Hip-Hop Songs, and Tony! Toni! Toné!'s "Just Me and You".

Track listing

Other songs
The following songs did appear in the film but were not released on any soundtrack:

Charts

Weekly charts

Year-end charts

Certifications

See also
List of number-one R&B albums of 1991 (U.S.)

References

External links

Boyz n the Hood (1991) Soundtrack on IMDb

1991 soundtrack albums
Hip hop soundtracks
Gangsta rap soundtracks
Qwest Records soundtracks
Contemporary R&B soundtracks
Warner Records soundtracks
Albums produced by DJ Pooh
Albums produced by Too Short
Albums produced by Al B. Sure!
Albums produced by Raphael Saadiq
Albums produced by Quincy Jones
Albums produced by Stanley Clarke
Drama film soundtracks